The Davao Eagles were a professional basketball team of the now-defunct Metropolitan Basketball Association from 1998 to 2002. The team was owned by Anthony del Rosario. The ballclub choose to be named 'Eagles' because the city is the home of the Philippine Eagle. In the MBA's final two years, the team became known as TPG-Davao or Professional Davao Eagles.

History

First season
The Eagles were handled by former national team coach Francis Rodriguez. The players includes Rodriguez' former wards at San Sebastian College during the 1980s; Eugene Quilban, Allan Garrido, Melchor Teves and Armoni Llagas. Two players, Rafael Santos and Jomar Tierra, were with Rodriguez' UE Warriors, while Lou Regidor and Aldrin Barola were under Rodriguez at Oriental Battery in the Philippine Basketball League.

Davao started out the inaugural season with five straight victories, with three of its wins, two by buzzer beaters and one via overtime against Manila, 90-86. The Eagles stunned Batangas Blades, 84-83, on the last second triple by Rafael Santos, and pulled an 82-80 win over Pasig Blue Pirates on Eugene Quilban's last second triple. 

The team finished with the best record in the Southern Conference during the regular season with 14 wins as against eight losses.

Next two seasons (1999-2000)
The following year in 1999, during the pre-season, the Eagles will no longer have Eugene Quilban in the lineup as he has joined Sta. Lucia Realtors in the PBA. Filling in his shoes is one-time PBL Most Valuable Player Bong Marata. Helping out Marata in the playing chores is Cebuano cager Felix Belano, who played for Chowking in the PBL last season and was actually drafted by Purefoods in the PBA's annual draft but failed to make it to the team's roster.

On June 2, 1999, the Davao Eagles were crowned the Southern Conference Mindanao division champions following a smashing 89-75 conquest of SocSarGen Marlins at the RMC gym. 

In the MBA's third season in 2000, Davao finished second and a game behind Cebu Gems in the Southern Conference with nine wins and three losses. Davao were swept by Negros Slashers in the best-of-three semifinal series.

Final two years (2001-2002)
Under coach Jun Noel, Davao ended up with 3 wins and 11 losses in the 2001 MBA first phase conference. The Eagles finished with four wins and ten losses in the second phase and were swept in two games by the Cebuana Lhuillier Gems in the semifinals.

Roster lists (1998-2002)

Peter Aguilar
Cris Bade
Aldrin Barola
Donbel Belano
Arvin Bonleon
Richie Cabrera
Chris de Jesus
Jonjit Duremdes
Allan Garrido
Paul Guerrero
Egay Ignacio
Armoni Llagas
Randy Lopez
Billy Mamaril
Mike Manigo
Romulo Marata
Jun Paguinto
Marlon Piodo

Eugene Quilban
Lou Regidor
Jondan Salvador
Rafael Santos
Genesis Sasuman
Peter June Simon
Stevenson Solomon
Melchor Teves
Jomar Tierra
Ariel Tizon
Cid White
Glenn Peter Yap

References

External links
MBA (1998-2002)@gameface.ph

Metropolitan Basketball Association teams
Basketball teams established in 1998
1998 establishments in the Philippines